A motor vehicle service or tune-up is a series of maintenance procedures carried out at a set time interval or after the vehicle has traveled a certain distance. The service intervals are specified by the vehicle manufacturer in a service schedule and some modern cars display the due date for the next service electronically on the instrument panel. A tune-up should not be confused with engine tuning, which is the modifying of an engine to perform better than the original specification, rather than using maintenance to keep the engine running as it should.

Common tasks involved in maintaining a vehicle
 Inspection - vehicle components are visually inspected for wear or any leaks. A diagnostic is performed to identify any electrical components reporting a failure or a part operating outside of normal conditions. 

 Replacement - Given certain lubricants break down over time due to heat and wear, manufacturers recommend replacement. Any parts that are close to their expected failure are replaced too to avoid a failure while operating the vehicle. 

 Adjustments - as vehicle components wear, they may need adjustment over time. Example: parking brake cable. 

The completed services are usually recorded in a service book upon completion of each service. A complete service history usually adds to the resale value of a vehicle.

Scheduling 
The actual schedule of car maintenance varies depending on the year, make, and model of a car, its driving conditions, and driver behavior. Carmakers recommend the so-called extreme or the ideal service schedule based on impact parameters such as
 the number of trips and distance traveled per trip per day
 extreme hot or cold climate conditions
 mountainous, dusty, or DE-iced roads
 heavy stop-and-go vs. long-distance cruising
 towing a trailer or other heavy load

Service advisers in dealerships and independent shops recommend schedule intervals, which are often in between the ideal or extreme service schedule.

Common maintenance 
Maintenance tasks commonly carried out during a motor vehicle service include:
 Change the engine oil
 Replace the oil filter
 Replace the air filter
 Replace the fuel filter
 Replace the cabin or a/c filter
 Replace the spark plugs
 Check level and refill brake fluid/clutch fluid
 Check Brake pads/Liners, Brake discs/Drums, and replace if worn out
 Check Coolant Hoses
 Check the charging systems
 Check the battery
 Check level and refill power steering fluid
 Check level and refill Automatic/Manual Transmission Fluid
 Grease and lubricate components
 Inspect and replace the timing belt or timing chain if needed
 Check condition of the tires
 Rotate Tires
 Check for proper operation of all lights, wipers, etc.
 Check for any error codes in the ECU and take corrective action.
 Use a scan tool to read trouble code.

Mechanical parts that may cause the car to cease transmission or prove unsafe for the road are also noted and advised upon.

In the United Kingdom, few parts that are not inspected on the MOT test are inspected and advised upon a Service Inspection, including clutch, gearbox, car battery, and engine components (further inspections than MOT).

See also 
 Auto mechanic
 Automobile repair shop
 Bus garage
 Car ramp, a means of accessing the underside of a vehicle
 Engine tuning
 Exhaust gas analyzer
 Italian tuneup
 Mechanical engineering

References

Sources

External links 

 
Maintenance
Maintenance